A CEO, or chief executive officer, is the highest-ranking corporate officer in an organisation.

CEO may also refer to:

Acronyms and codes
 CEO (Data General), or Comprehensive Electronic Office, a 1981 suite of office automation software
 Center for Equal Opportunity, an American conservative think tank
 Chief Electoral Officer (disambiguation), an electoral oversighter
 Chief experimental officer, head of an experimental organization
 Civil enforcement officer, a person who enforces, parking, traffic, and other laws
 Civilian enforcement officer, an official of Her Majesty's Courts and Tribunals Service in the UK
 Collegiate Entrepreneurs Organization, a student organization that publishes Study Breaks magazine
 Community Effort Orlando, an annual fighting game event
 Corporate Europe Observatory, a non-profit research and campaign group
 Waco Kungo Airport, Angola (IATA code)

Arts and entertainment
 Ceo (musician), the solo project of Eric Berglund
 "CEO", a 2021 song by Netta Barzilai
 "CEO", a 2021 song by Snoop Dogg from From tha Streets 2 tha Suites
 The CEO, a 2016 Nigerian film

See also
 Ceos, Latin name for the Greek island of Kea in the Cyclades archipelago
 Child Exploitation and Obscenity Section, of the United States Department of Justice Criminal Division